The 1926 Regis Rangers football team was an American football team that represented Regis College as an independent during the 1926 college football season. The team compiled a 6–2 record and outscored opponents by a total of 119 to 93. Tom McNamara was the head football coach.

Schedule

References

Regis
Regis Rangers football seasons
Regis Rangers football